Ashish Singh Patel is an Indian politician currently serving as Cabinet minister, Government of Uttar Pradesh. He is Technical Education, Consumer Protection, Weights and Measures Minister, Government of Uttar Pradesh and also member of the Uttar Pradesh Legislative Council. He is a working president of the Apna Dal (Sonelal) party and husband of Minister of State in the Ministry of Commerce and Industry Anupriya Patel. He completed his B.tech. in Civil Engineering from Bundelkhand Institute of Engineering & Technology Jhansi.

References

Year of birth missing (living people)
Living people
Apna Dal politicians
Apna Dal (Sonelal) politicians
Members of the Uttar Pradesh Legislative Council